The Tiger Woman is a 1945 American crime film directed by Philip Ford, written by George Carleton Brown, and starring Adele Mara, Kane Richmond, Richard Fraser, Peggy Stewart, Cy Kendall and Gregory Gaye. It was released on November 16, 1945, by Republic Pictures.

Plot

Nightclub singer Sharon Winslow tells a detective, Jerry Devery, that her husband owes gambler Joe Sapphire a lot of money and fears he will be killed. Sapphire insists to the cop that the debt has been paid in full, but when Sharon's husband is found dead, suspicion understandably falls on Sapphire.

It turns out the dead man left a suicide note, but Sharon and her lover, her husband's business partner Stephen Mason, destroy the note so that Sharon can claim it was a murder and collect the insurance money. Sharon is, in fact, the murderer, and she double-crosses Mason as well.

A suspicious Jerry decides to romance Sharon just to be able to get closer to her. They go away together on a train, where Sharon pulls a gun on Jerry and admits that he was right about her. His police colleagues then come out of hiding to place her under arrest.

Cast  
Adele Mara as Sharon Winslow
Kane Richmond as Jerry Devery
Richard Fraser as Stephen Mason
Peggy Stewart as Phyllis Carrington
Cy Kendall as Inspector Henry Leggett
Gregory Gaye as Joe Sapphire 
John Kelly as Sylvester
Beverly Lloyd as Constance Grey
Addison Richards as Mr. White
Donia Bussey as Rosie Gargan
Frank Reicher as Coroner
Garry Owen as Bartender

References

External links 
 

1945 films
American crime films
1945 crime films
Republic Pictures films
Films directed by Philip Ford
American black-and-white films
1940s English-language films
1940s American films